Sara Larsson (born 26 June 1983), known professionally by her stage name SaRaha, is a Swedish singer and songwriter based in Tanzania. She first achieved public attention in Sweden during Melodifestivalen 2016.

Life and career
Larsson was born on 26 June 1983 in Vänersborg, Sweden and soon moved to Tanzania with her family in 1985. At age 18, she moved to Zimbabwe which is where she began her music career, performing with Zimbabwean bands in Harare. She later returned to Tanzania in 2009. In 2011, she released the song "Tanesco" which became her breakout hit in Tanzania. She later released the song "My Dear", and released her debut album Mblele Kiza in 2014. The song "Mbele Kiza" later also gained attention in Sweden. She participated in Melodifestivalen 2016 with the song "Kizunguzungu", and qualified to andra chansen from the third semi-final. In the final she placed ninth with the juries, seventh with the Swedish public, and ninth overall.

Discography

Studio albums

Singles

Featured singles
"My Dear" (Akil feat. SaRaha) (2011)
"Fei" (Fid Q feat. SaRaha) (2011)
"Don't Cry" (Makamua feat. SaRaha) (2012)
"Usiku wa giza" (Nako 2 Nako feat. SaRaha) (2012)
"Siongopi" (Joh Makini feat. SaRaha) (2012)
"Mazoea" (Big Jahman feat. SaRaha & Nura) (2012)
"Dream" (Hustler Jay feat. SaRaha) (2013)
"Ghetto Love" (Magenge ft. SaRaha) (2013)
"Chips Mayai" (Q Chilla feat. SaRaha) (2013)
"Habibty" (Akil feat. SaRaha) (2014)
"Tuongee" (Makamua feat. SaRaha) (2015)

References

External links
 SaRaha - MistariYetu

Living people
1983 births
People from Vänersborg Municipality
Swedish emigrants to Tanzania
Swedish expatriates in Tanzania
Swedish expatriates in Zimbabwe
Swahili-language singers
21st-century Swedish women singers
Melodifestivalen contestants of 2016